"I'd Do It All Over Again" is a hit 1945 song by Dick Robertson, Frank Weldon and James Cavanaugh. It was recorded by the orchestras of Hal McIntyre and again by Frankie Carle.

References

1945 songs
Songs written by James Cavanaugh (songwriter)
Songs written by Frank Weldon
Songs written by Dick Robertson (songwriter)